The 2007–08 season was Swindon Town's first season in the League One since their relegation from the division in 2006. Alongside the league campaign, Swindon Town will also competed in the FA Cup, League Cup and the Football League Trophy.

League One

League table

Matchday squads

League One line-ups 

1 1st Substitution, 2 2nd Substitution, 3 3rd Substitution.

FA Cup line-ups 

1 1st Substitution, 2 2nd Substitution, 3 3rd Substitution.

League Cup line-ups 

1 1st Substitution, 2 2nd Substitution, 3 3rd Substitution.

Football League Trophy line-ups 

1 1st Substitution, 2 2nd Substitution, 3 3rd Substitution.

References 

Swindon Town F.C. seasons
Swindon Town F.C.